Andrew Gerald Ogilvie Hay (born 18 February 1964) is a former New Zealand rowing cox.

At the 1982 World Rowing Championships at Rotsee, Switzerland, he won a gold medal with the New Zealand eight. At the 1983 World Rowing Championships at Wedau in Duisburg, Germany, he won a gold medal with the New Zealand eight. In 1986 he won a bronze medal in the eight at the Commonwealth Games in Edinburgh.

In 1982, the 1982 rowing eight crew was named sportsman of the year. The 1982 team was inducted into the New Zealand Sports Hall of Fame in 1995.

References

1964 births
Living people
New Zealand male rowers
Coxswains (rowing)
Rowers at the 1984 Summer Olympics
World Rowing Championships medalists for New Zealand
Commonwealth Games medallists in rowing
Commonwealth Games bronze medallists for New Zealand
Rowers at the 1986 Commonwealth Games
Olympic rowers of New Zealand
20th-century New Zealand people
21st-century New Zealand people
Medallists at the 1986 Commonwealth Games